The list of periods and events in climate history includes some notable climate events known to paleoclimatology.  Knowledge of precise climatic events decreases as the record goes further back in time. The timeline of glaciation covers ice ages specifically, which tend to have their own names for phases, often with different names used for different parts of the world. The names for earlier periods and events come from geology and paleontology. The marine isotope stages (MIS) are often used to express dating within the Quaternary.

 
Scale: Millions of years before present, earlier dates approximate.

 Before 1,000 Mya Faint young Sun paradox 
 2,400 Mya Great Oxidation Event probably leads to Huronian glaciation perhaps covering the whole globe 
 650–600 Mya Later Neoproterozoic Snowball Earth or Marinoan glaciation, precursor to the Cambrian explosion
 517 Mya End-Botomian mass extinction; like the next two, little understood
 502 Mya Dresbachian extinction event 
  Mya Cambrian–Ordovician extinction event 
 450–440 Mya Ordovician–Silurian extinction event, in two bursts, after cooling perhaps caused by tectonic plate movement
 450 Mya Andean-Saharan glaciation
 360-260 Mya Karoo Ice Age
 305 Mya cooler climate causes Carboniferous rainforest collapse
  Mya Permian–Triassic extinction event 
 199.6 Mya Triassic–Jurassic extinction event, causes as yet unclear
 66 Mya, perhaps 30,000 years of volcanic activity form the Deccan Traps in India, Or a large meteor impact.
  Mya Cretaceous–Paleogene boundary and Cretaceous–Paleogene extinction event, extinction of dinosaurs 
 55.8 Mya Paleocene–Eocene Thermal Maximum 
 53.7 Mya Eocene Thermal Maximum 2 
 49 Mya Azolla event may have ended a long warm period
 5.3–2.6 Mya Pliocene climate became cooler and drier, and seasonal, similar to modern climates.
 2.5 Mya to present Quaternary glaciation, with permanent ice on the polar regions, many named stages in different parts of the world

Pleistocene
All dates are approximate. "(B-S)" means this is one of the periods from the Blytt-Sernander sequence, originally based on studies of Danish peat bogs.

 120,000–90,000 BP Abbassia Pluvial wet in North Africa
 110,000–10,000 BP Last Glacial Period, not to be confused with the Last Glacial Maximum or Late Glacial Maximum below
 50,000–30,000 BP Mousterian Pluvial wet in North Africa
 26,500–19,000–20,000 BP Last Glacial Maximum, what is often meant in popular usage by "Last Ice Age"
 16,000–13,000 BC Oldest Dryas cold, begins slowly and ends sharply (B-S) 
 12,700 BC Antarctic Cold Reversal warmer Antarctic, sea level rise
 12,400 BC Bølling oscillation warm and wet in the North Atlantic, begins the Bølling-Allerød period (B-S)
 12,400–11,500 BC (much discussed) Older Dryas cold, interrupts warm period for some centuries (B-S)
 12,000–11,000 BC Allerød oscillation warm & moist (B-S)
 11,400–9,500 BC Huelmo–Mascardi Cold Reversal cold in Southern Hemisphere  
 11,000-8,000 BC Last Glacial Maximum, or Tardiglacial (definitions vary)
 10,800–9,500 BC Younger Dryas sudden cold and dry period in Northern Hemisphere (B-S)

Holocene
All dates are BC (BCE) and approximate. "(B-S)" means this is one of the periods from the Blytt-Sernander sequence, originally based on studies of Danish peat bogs.

 From 10,000 BC Holocene glacial retreat, the present Holocene or Postglacial period begins  
 9,400 BC Pre-Boreal sharp rise in temperature over 50 years (B-S), precedes Boreal
 8,500 – 6,900 BC Boreal (B-S), rising sea levels, forest replaces tundra in northern Europe
 7,500 – 3,900 BC Neolithic Subpluvial/African humid period in North Africa, wet 
 7,000 – 3,000 BC Holocene climatic optimum, or Atlantic in northern Europe (B-S)  
 6,200 BC 8.2-kiloyear event cold
 5,000–4,100 BC Older Peron warm and wet, global sea levels were 2.5 to 4 meters (8 to 13 feet) higher than the twentieth-century average
 3,900 BC 5.9 kiloyear event dry and cold.
 3,500 BC End of the African humid period, Neolithic Subpluvial in North Africa, expands Sahara Desert
 3,000 BC - 0 Neopluvial in North America
 3,200–2,900 BC Piora Oscillation, cold, perhaps not global. Wetter in Europe, drier elsewhere, linked to the domestication of the horse in Central Asia.
 2,200 BC  4.2-kiloyear event dry, lasted most of the 22nd century BC, linked to the end of the Old Kingdom in Egypt, and the Akkadian Empire in Mesopotamia, various archaeological cultures in Persia and China 
 1800-1500 BC Middle Bronze Age Cold Epoch, a period of unusually cold climate in the North Atlantic region
 Bond Event 2 – possibly triggering the Late Bronze Age collapse
 900 – 300 BC Iron Age Cold Epoch cold in North Atlantic. Perhaps associated with the Homeric Minimum
 250 BC – 400 AD Roman Warm Period

Common Era/AD 
 Climate changes of 535-536 (535–536 AD), sudden cooling and failure of harvests, perhaps caused by volcanic dust
 900–1300 Medieval Warm Period, wet in Europe, arid in North America, may have depopulated the Great Plains of North America, associated with the Medieval renaissances in Europe
 Great Famine of 1315–1317 in Europe
 Little Ice Age: Various dates between 1250 and 1550 or later are held to mark the start of the Little ice age, ending at equally varied dates around 1850
 1460–1550 Spörer Minimum cold
 1656–1715 Maunder Minimum low sunspot activity
 1790–1830 Dalton Minimum low sunspot activity, cold
 1816 Year Without a Summer, caused by volcanic dust of Mount Tambora eruption
 1850–present Retreat of glaciers since 1850, instrumental temperature record
 Present and recent past global warming, perhaps to be named the Anthropocene period

See also
Climate change (modern day)
Climate change (general concept)
Climate across Cretaceous–Paleogene boundary
Thermal history of Earth
Geologic temperature record

Climate history
History
Events that forced the climate